Shelfordella is a genus of cockroach found in north-east Africa and Asia, through to western India.

Species
Shelfordella arabica (Bei Bienko, 1938)
Shelfordella lateralis (Walker, 1868)
Shelfordella monochroma (Walker, 1871)

Additional images

References

Cockroach genera